Michel-Pierre Pontbriand (born March 4, 1985) is a Canadian football fullback who is currently a free agent. He was signed as undrafted free agent by the Winnipeg Blue Bombers on August 17, 2011, after playing and finished 1st team all-star as the special teams captain for Team Canada at the football Senior Men's World Championship in Austria He played CIS Football with the Laval Rouge et Or. He won 3 national championship with Laval as a starter and played in 2 East-West bowl classic in Quebec. He played 3 years for Team Quebec when he was in college. He played with the 2003 Canadian Junior Team in San Diego, Cal. He has been named captain on the Bombers special team squad during 2012 to 2016. He was recognized for his strong leadership, work ethic and discipline. During his professional career, he played and competed in all regulars and playoffs games and never missed a single practice. He did a lot of volunteer in Winnipeg to help football programs. Before playing football, he played AAA soccer, hockey and baseball until the age of 18.

References

External links
Winnipeg Blue Bombers bio

1985 births
Living people
Players of Canadian football from Quebec
Canadian football fullbacks
Laval Rouge et Or football players
People from Laurentides
Winnipeg Blue Bombers players